The Mysterious Miss C. is a Canadian children's fantasy-comedy film, directed by Richard Ciupka and released in 2002. The film stars Marie-Chantal Perron as Mademoiselle Charlotte, a quirky supply teacher who transforms the lives of a struggling class of elementary students. The film was adapted from the "Mlle. Charlotte" series of children's novels by Dominique Demers. The film was the sixth highest-grossing Canadian film of 2002.

Demers received a Genie Award nomination for Best Adapted Screenplay at the 23rd Genie Awards. Perron received a Prix Jutra nomination for Best Actress, and Jean-François Bergeron was nominated for Best Editing, at the 5th Jutra Awards.

A sequel film, The Incomparable Miss C. (L'incomparable Mademoiselle C.), was released in 2004.

References

External links
 

2002 films
Canadian children's comedy films
Canadian fantasy comedy films
Canadian children's fantasy films
Canadian ghost films
Films shot in Montreal
Films set in Montreal
Films directed by Richard Ciupka
French-language Canadian films
2000s Canadian films
2000s French-language films